Benjamin Andrew (born 5 February 1973), is a former professional footballer who has played in the Scottish Football League First Division for East Fife.

Career
Andrew began his professional career with East Fife and was part of the squad that won promotion to the SFL First Division in 1996. The Methil side only won two games the following year in the second tier of Scottish football, however Andrew did score in their first and only home victory that season against Falkirk. After a short spell at Montrose, Andrew joined Junior side Glenrothes in 1999 where he remained for eleven seasons and earned a testimonial match against a Celtic XI in 2009.

Andrew returned to Glenrothes as manager in November 2014 but resigned from his position in September 2016.

References

External links

Living people
1973 births
Scottish footballers
Lochore Welfare F.C. players
East Fife F.C. players
Montrose F.C. players
Glenrothes F.C. players
Scottish Football League players
Scottish Junior Football Association players
Scottish football managers
Association football wing halves